Juan Bustillos Montalvo (born 9 June 1955) is a Mexican politician affiliated with the Institutional Revolutionary Party. As of 2014 he served as Deputy of the LV and LIX Legislatures of the Mexican Congress representing Veracruz.

References

1955 births
Living people
Politicians from Veracruz
Institutional Revolutionary Party politicians
Universidad Tecnológica de México alumni
20th-century Mexican politicians
21st-century Mexican politicians
Deputies of the LIX Legislature of Mexico
Members of the Chamber of Deputies (Mexico) for Veracruz